The Amis, also known as the Pangcah, are an indigenous Austronesian ethnic group native to Taiwan. They speak the Amis language, an Austronesian language, and are one of the sixteen officially recognized Taiwanese indigenous peoples. The traditional territory of the Amis includes the long, narrow valley between the Central Mountains and the Coastal Mountains (Huadong Valley), the Pacific coastal plain eastern to the Coastal Mountains and the Hengchun Peninsula.

In 2014, the Amis numbered 200,604. This was approximately 37.1% of Taiwan's total indigenous population, making them the largest indigenous group. The Amis are primarily fishermen due to their coastal location. They traditionally had a matrilineal kinship system, by which inheritance and property pass through the maternal line, and children are considered born to the mother's people.

Traditional Amis villages were relatively large for Taiwanese indigenous communities, typically holding between 500 and 1,000 people. In today's Taiwan, the Amis also comprise the majority of "urban indigenous people" and have developed many urban communities all around the island. In recent decades, Amis have also married exogamously to the Han as well as other indigenous peoples.

Identity and classification 

The Amis people refer to themselves by two different ethnonyms. While those living in the East Rift Valley and Hualien County generally identify as Pangcah, which means "human" or "people of our kind," Amis living in coastal Taitung County employ the term Amis. Perhaps because of the official name, in 21st-century Taiwan, the term Amis is much more frequently used. This name comes from the word 'amis, meaning "north." There is still no consensus in the academic circle as to how "'Amis" came to be used to address the Pangcah. It may originally have been a term used by the Puyuma to refer to the Pangcah, who lived to the north of them. Another theory is that those who lived in the Taitung Plain called themselves "'Amis" because their ancestors had come from the north.  This later explanation is recorded in the Banzoku Chōsa Hōkokusho, indicating this term may have originated from a group classified by anthropologists as Falangaw Amis, the Amis group occupying territory from today's Chengkung to the Taitung Plain. Their closest genetic relatives appear to be the native Filipino people.

According to Taiwanese Aboriginal History: Amis, the Amis are classified into five groups:

 Northern group (located on the Chihlai/Hualien Plain)
 Middle group (located west of the Coastal Mountains)
 Coastal group (located east of the Coastal Mountains)
 Falangaw group (located Chenggong and the Taitung Plain)
 Hengchun group (located on the Hengchun Peninsula)

Such classification, however widely accepted, is based simply on the geographical distribution and ethnic migration. It does not correspond to observed differences in culture, language, and physiques.

The People's Republic of China (PRC), which claims Taiwan as part of its own territory, considers all of the Amis as part of a Gaoshan ethnic group, one of the 56 ethnic groups of the PRC.

Traditions 

Family affairs, including finance of the family, are decided by the female householder, in the Amis tradition. The most important traditional ceremony is the Harvest Festival. The Amis Harvest Festival is held to express the people's thanks and appreciation to the gods, and to pray for harvest in the next coming year. It takes place every July to September.

Representation in media
The musical project Enigma used an Amis chant in their song "Return to Innocence," on their second album, The Cross of Changes (1993). This song was used as the theme song of the 1996 Atlanta Olympics. The main chorus was sung by Difang and Igay Duana, who were part of a Taiwanese aboriginal cultural performance group.

Maison des Cultures du Monde had earlier recorded the singing of this group while on tour, and released a CD. 
This song was subsequently used by Enigma (although they did not note the ethnic origin of the song and the singers). The recording studio and the Taiwanese group filed a suit for copyright infringement, which was later settled by Enigma out of court. Ami singing is known for its complex contrapuntal polyphony.

Notable Amis people

 A-Lin, singer, songwriter
 Ngayaw Ake, baseball player
 Yu Chang, baseball player
 Lin Chih-chieh, basketball player
 Chen Chih-yuan, baseball player
 Yang Chuan-kwang, Olympic decathlete
 Kuo Dai-chi, baseball player
 Mayaw Dongi, Minister of Council of Indigenous Peoples (2013–2016)
 Difang and Igay Duana, husband-and-wife folk music duo
 Van Fan, singer, actor
 Ehlo Huang, actor and member of pop group 183 Club
 Jam Hsiao, singer
 Kuo Hsing-chun, weightlifter and Olympic gold medalist
 Ilid Kaolo, singer and songwriter
 Ayal Komod, singer
 Tseng Li-cheng, 2012 Olympics Taekwondo bronze medalist
 Show Lo, singer, actor, host
 Lin Man-ting, football and futsal player
 Ati Masaw, baseball player
 Teruo Nakamura, Taiwan-born soldier of the Imperial Japanese Army and the last Japanese holdout soldier of World War II
 Kawlo Iyun Pacidal, member of Legislative Yuan
 Kolas Yotaka, member of Legislative Yuan and Spokesperson for the Executive Yuan and the Office of the President
 Icyang Parod, Minister of Council of Indigenous Peoples
 Yang Sen, baseball player
 Sufin Siluko, member of Legislative Yuan
 Suming, actor, singer, songwriter. His music features elements from traditional Amis culture. Founder of the Amis Music Festival.
 Li Tai-hsiang, composer and folk songwriter
 Tank, singer
 Tseng Te-Ping, singer
 Chin-hui Tsao, baseball player
 Dai-Kang Yang, baseball player
 Wei-Chung Wang, baseball player
 Huang Weijin, singer, actor, host

See also
 Demographics of Taiwan
 Taiwanese indigenous peoples
 Amis Folk Center
 Kawas (mythology)

References

Further reading

External links 

 Taiwanese government page on the Amis 
 Amis Festivals
 Website dedicated to a documentary shot in the Amis village of Tafalong (Taiwan East Coast)
 Shamanic Healing among the Amis and Contemporary Christian Healing in the Spirit